Mansoa may refer to:

Mansôa, a town in Guinea-Bissau
Mansoa (plant), a genus of plants in the family Bignoniaceae